Robbie "Rob" Modra is an Australian professional darts player who competes in Professional Darts Corporation events.

Career

He failed to win a PDC Pro Tour Card at the 2016 Qualifying School. He is still eligible to compete in the PDC's second tier PDC Unicorn Challenge Tour. He reached the final of the second event in 2016, gaining £1,000.

World Championship results

BDO
 2016: Preliminary Round (lost to John Walton 0–3) (sets)

References

External links
 Rob Modra on Darts Database

Living people
Australian darts players
British Darts Organisation players
Professional Darts Corporation associate players
1972 births
Sportspeople from Adelaide
People from Melbourne